Emeline Horton Cleveland (September 22, 1829December 8, 1878) was an American physician and one of the first women to perform major abdominal or gynecological surgery in the United States. She became one of the first woman physicians associated with a large public hospital in the United States, and she established one of the first nursing assistant training programs in the country. 

A graduate of Oberlin College and the Women's Medical College of Pennsylvania, Cleveland received postgraduate training in Philadelphia, Paris and London that was focused on obstetrics and gynecology and hospital administration. By 1872, she was the dean on the Woman's Medical College. Cleveland suffered from tuberculosis for the last several years of her life.

Early life
Cleveland was born Emeline Horton in Ashford, Connecticut, to Chauncey Horton and Amanda Chaffee Horton. Her paternal ancestors had been Puritans who came to the United States in the 1630s. Cleveland had eight siblings, six of them younger. When Cleveland was two years old, her family moved to a farm in Madison County, New York, where she received her schooling from tutors. Though Cleveland had aspirations of becoming a missionary that had started when she was a child, her father died when she was young, so she became a teacher in order to save enough money to attend college. 

In 1850, Cleveland enrolled at Oberlin College, graduating three years later. She had begun corresponding with Sarah Josepha Hale, who was the editor of a women's magazine known as Godey's Lady's Book. Hale was also secretary of a new organization known as the Pennsylvania Ladies' Missionary Society, and she told Cleveland about efforts at the Female Medical College of Pennsylvania (later known as the Women's Medical College of Pennsylvania) to train women to serve as missionary physicians. Cleveland earned a medical degree after two years at the Female Medical College.

While she was in medical school, Emeline had married a childhood friend of hers, Giles Butler Cleveland; he had gone to the Oberlin Theological Seminary to become a Presbyterian minister at the same time that she went off to Oberlin. The couple wanted to work as missionaries, but Giles became ill, eliminating the possibility of mission work. To support them, Emeline started a medical practice in Oneida Valley, New York. By late 1856, she was invited to teach anatomy courses at the Female Medical College of Philadelphia, so Cleveland and her husband moved back there.

Career
When the couple moved back to Philadelphia, Cleveland's husband was able to find a job as a teacher. A little over a year after their arrival, he became seriously ill again, and he was left partially paralyzed and out of work. Cleveland stayed at the Female Medical College until 1860 when physician colleague Ann Preston and several local Quaker women paid for Cleveland to go to Paris and London for further studies in obstetrics, gynecological surgery and hospital administration.

Returning to Philadelphia in 1862, Cleveland became chief resident at the Woman's Hospital of Philadelphia, which Ann Preston had established while Cleveland was in Europe. The goal of the hospital was to provide patient care experience for medical students at the Woman's Medical College of Philadelphia, as they often faced discrimination in trying to gain clinical experiences at other hospitals. In 1872, Cleveland became the dean of the medical school when Preston died. Cleveland established training programs for nurses at the college, and she started one of the earliest programs to train nursing assistants. Her health was tenuous, and that forced her to step down as dean in 1874.

In 1875, an article was published in a regional medical journal regarding Cleveland's performance of an ovariotomy in a patient who had been suffering from a cystic tumor of the ovary that had led to a large fluid collection within the abdomen. One of Cleveland's students wrote the journal article, making a concluding point that Cleveland's work was evidence that women could make good surgeons.

Death
In 1878, Cleveland was named a gynecologist for the Pennsylvania Hospital Department for the Insane, marking one of the first times that a woman had become a physician for a large public hospital. She died of tuberculosis later that year. She was buried next to Ann Preston at Fair Hill Cemetery in Philadelphia. She was survived by her husband and by a son, Arthur Horton Cleveland, who became a physician. She was succeeded as chair of obstetrics by her mentee, Dr. Anna Broomall.

Cleveland's legacy was that of a physician who combined medical acumen with femininity and a down-to-earth demeanor. These factors may have helped her succeed in a male-dominated field because she was not seen as trying to upset the social order between men and women. Mary Corinna Putnam Jacobi, an influential physician who attended the Female Medical College in the 1860s, said that Cleveland was "a woman of real ability... personal beauty, and grace of manner."

References

Sources

Further reading

1829 births
1878 deaths
People from Ashford, Connecticut
19th-century deaths from tuberculosis
Oberlin College alumni
Woman's Medical College of Pennsylvania alumni
Women surgeons
People from Madison County, New York
American surgeons
19th-century American women physicians
19th-century American physicians
Tuberculosis deaths in Pennsylvania